The following is a list of notable seafood restaurants. A seafood restaurant typically specializes in seafood cuisine and seafood dishes, such as fish and shellfish.

Seafood restaurants

Australia 
 Doyles on the Beach

Canada 
 Joey's Seafood Restaurants

Hong Kong 
 ClubONE Riviera
 Heichinrou Hong Kong
 Jumbo Kingdom

Mexico 
 El Dorado, Puerto Vallarta
 The Blue Shrimp, Puerto Vallarta
 La Palapa, Puerto Vallarta

Ireland 
 Leo Burdock
 Moran's Oyster Cottage

Israel 
 Mul Yam

Germany 
 Nordsee

Singapore 
 Long Beach Seafood Restaurant
 Jumbo Seafood
 Palm Beach Seafood

Sweden 
 Sturehof

Thailand 
 Royal Dragon Restaurant

United Kingdom 
 Anstruther Fish Bar, Scotland
 The Ashvale, Scotland
 Bentley's Oyster Bar and Grill
 Harbourmaster Hotel
 Harry Ramsden's
 Magpie Café, England
 Loch Fyne Oysters, Scotland
 Loch Fyne Restaurants 
 Riverside Restaurant, England 
 Scott's
 Sweetings

United States 

Seafood restaurants in the United States include:

 Acadia: A New Orleans Bistro, Portland, Oregon
 Aquagrill, New York City (defunct)
 Arthur Treacher's
 Athenian Seafood Restaurant and Bar, Seattle
 Atlantic Grill, New York City
 Aunt Carrie's, Narragansett, Rhode Island
 Bagaduce Lunch, Brooksville, Maine
 Bahrs, Highlands, New Jersey
 Batterfish, Portland, Oregon
 Le Bernardin, New York City
 Bonefish Grill
 Boston Sea Party (defunct)
 Bubba Gump Shrimp Company
 California Fish Grill
 Calumet Fisheries, Chicago
 Cameron's Seafood Market
 Captain D's
 Chez Melange, Redondo Beach, California
 Coastal Kitchen, Seattle
 Colonnade (defunct)
 Coral Reef Restaurant
 Country Bill's, Portland, Oregon
 The Crab Claw Restaurant, St. Michaels, Maryland
 The Crab Cooker, Newport Beach, California
 Dan and Louis Oyster Bar, Portland, Oregon
 Driftwood Inn and Restaurant, Vero Beach, Florida
 East Coast Grill
 Eat: An Oyster Bar, Portland, Oregon
 Eddie V's Prime Seafood
 Emmett Watson's Oyster Bar, Seattle
 Fish Grotto, Portland, Oregon (defunct)
 Fisherman's Restaurant and Bar, Seattle
 Flying Fish Company, Portland, Oregon
 Gladstones Malibu, Pacific Palisades, California
 Grand Central Oyster Bar & Restaurant, New York City
 Greek Islands, Chicago
 Gus Stevens Seafood Restaurant & Buccaneer Lounge, Biloxi, Mississippi (defunct)
 H. Salt Esq. Fish & Chips
 Hank's Oyster Bar, Washington, D.C. and Alexandria, Virginia
 Hayato, Los Angeles
 Hoss's Steak and Sea House
 Ivar's
 Jack's Fish Spot, Seattle
 Jacqueline, Portland, Oregon
 Jake's Famous Crawfish, Portland, Oregon
 Joe's Crab Shack
 Joe's Stone Crab, Miami Beach, Florida
 L2O, Chicago (defunct)
 Lark, Seattle
 Legal Sea Foods
 Long John Silver's
 Lundy's Restaurant, New York City (defunct)
 Marea, New York City
 Matt's in the Market, Seattle
 McCormick & Schmick's
 McGrath's Fish House
 Mitchell's Fish Market, Columbus, Ohio
 Ocean Prime
 Oceanique, Evanston, Illinois
 Old Fisherman's Grotto, Monterey, California
 Palisade, Seattle
 Pappadeaux
 The Parish, Portland, Oregon
 Pêche Seafood Grill, New Orleans
 Phillips Foods, Inc. and Seafood Restaurants
 Portland Fish Market, Portland, Oregon
 Red Lobster
 RingSide Fish House, Portland, Oregon
 Roy's
 Saltbox Seafood Joint, Durham, North Carolina
 Sam Woo Restaurant
 Seasons and Regions Seafood Grill, Portland, Oregon
 Shuckum's Oyster Bar, Hollywood, Florida
 Skippers Seafood & Chowder House
 Slapfish, Huntington Beach, California
 Southpark Seafood, Portland, Oregon
 Spenger's Fresh Fish Grotto, Berkeley, California (defunct)
 Swan Oyster Depot, San Francisco
 Tadich Grill, San Francisco
 Ted Peters Famous Smoked Fish, South Pasadena, Florida
 Thurston's Lobster Pound, Maine
 Todai
 Umbertos Clam House, New York City
 Union Oyster House, Boston
 Vivenda do Camarão, Florida
 The Walrus and the Carpenter, Seattle
 Water Grill
 Waterman's Beach Lobster, South Thomaston, Maine (defunct)
 Weathervane Restaurant
 White Swan Public House, Seattle
 Wong's King, Portland, Oregon
 Woodman's of Essex, Essex, Massachusetts
 Yia Yia Mary's, Houston, Texas

See also

 List of fish and chip restaurants
 List of oyster bars
 List of sushi restaurants

References

Seafood
Seafood restaurants